Krzysztof Kaczmarek (18 November 1978 - 16 April 2017) was a Polish Paralympic athlete who competed at international track and field competitions. He was Paralympic champion and a World bronze medalist in shot put, he has also won multiple medals at the INAS World Athletics Championships. Kaczmarek died suddenly aged 38.

References

1978 births
2017 deaths
People from Zduńska Wola
Paralympic athletes of Poland
Polish male discus throwers
Polish male hammer throwers
Polish male shot putters
Athletes (track and field) at the 2000 Summer Paralympics
Medalists at the 2000 Summer Paralympics
Medalists at the World Para Athletics Championships
20th-century Polish people
21st-century Polish people